The 1968–69 Mitropa Cup was the 29th season of the Mitropa football club tournament. It was won by Inter Bratislava who beat Sklo Union Teplice in the two-legged final 4–1 on aggregate.

Round of 16

|}

Quarter-finals

|}

Semi-finals

|}

Final

|}

See also
1968–69 European Cup
1968–69 European Cup Winners' Cup
1968–69 Inter-Cities Fairs Cup

External links
1968–69 Mitropa Cup at Rec.Sport.Soccer Statistics Foundation

1968-69
1968–69 in European football
1968–69 in Hungarian football
1968–69 in Yugoslav football
1968–69 in Austrian football
1968–69 in Czechoslovak football
1968–69 in Italian football